Peter Archer may refer to:
Peter Archer, Baron Archer of Sandwell (1926–2012), British Labour peer and politician
Peter Archer (actor) (1943–2000), Australian entrepreneur and martial arts champion
Peter Archer (author), author of several Forgotten Realms novels
Peter Archer, member of Australian rock band Crow